Changji Hui Autonomous Prefecture is an autonomous prefecture for Hui people in the middle north of Xinjiang Uyghur Autonomous Region, Western China.

Subdivisions 
Changji directly controls 2 county-level cities, 4 counties and 1 autonomous county.

 Defunct: Miquan (county-level city)

Demographics 
According to the 2010 census, Changji had a population of 1,428,587 inhabitants, with a population density of 19.4 inhabitants per km2. Its population in the 2000 census was 1,503,097. Part of the change in population is due to boundary changes, for example, the formerly county-level city Miquan was merged into Midong District and became part of Ürümqi in 2007. The population in 2000 minus Miquan was 1,322,145.

Sister cities 
 Barnaul, Altai Krai, Russia

References 

 
Populated places in Xinjiang
Prefecture-level divisions of Xinjiang
Autonomous prefectures of the People's Republic of China